The REO Motor Car Company was a company based in Lansing, Michigan, which produced automobiles and trucks from 1905 to 1975. At one point, the company also manufactured buses on its truck platforms.

Ransom E. Olds was an entrepreneur who founded multiple companies in the automobile industry. In 1897 Olds founded Oldsmobile. In 1905 Olds left Oldsmobile and established a new company, REO Motor Car Company, in Lansing, Michigan. Olds had 52% of the stock and the titles of president and general manager. To ensure a reliable supply of parts, he organized a number of subsidiary firms, like the National Coil Company, the Michigan Screw Company, and the Atlas Drop Forge Company.

Originally the company was to be called "R. E. Olds Motor Car Company", but the owner of Olds' previous company, then called Olds Motor Works, objected and threatened legal action on the grounds of likely confusion of names by consumers.
Olds then changed the name to his initials. Olds Motor Works soon adopted the popular name of its vehicles, Oldsmobile (which, along with Buick and Cadillac, became a founding division of General Motors Corporation).

The company's name was spelled alternately in all capitals REO or with only an initial capital as Reo, and the company's own literature was inconsistent in this regard, with early advertising using all capitals, and later advertising using the "Reo" capitalization. The pronunciation, however, was as a single word. Lansing is home to the R. E. Olds Transportation Museum.

Early REO production 

By 1907, REO had gross sales of $4.5 million, and the company was one of the four wealthiest automobile manufacturers in the U.S. After 1908, however, despite the introduction of improved cars designed by Olds, REO's share of the automobile market decreased due in part to competition from emerging companies like Ford and General Motors.

REO added a truck-manufacturing division and a Canadian plant in St Catharines, Ontario, in 1910. Two years later, Olds claimed that he had built the best car he could, a tourer able to seat two, four, or five, with a  engine,  wheelbase, and  wheels, for $1,055 (not including top, windshield, or gas tank, which were US$100 extra); self-starter was $25 on top of that.

In 1915, Olds relinquished the title of general manager to his protégé Richard H. Scott, and eight years later he ended his tenure as the company's presidency as well, retaining the position of chairman of the board.

Perhaps the most famous REO episode was the 1912 Trans-Canada journey. Traveling  from Halifax, Nova Scotia, to Vancouver, British Columbia, in a 1912 REO special touring car, mechanic/driver Fonce V. (Jack) Haney and journalist Thomas W. Wilby made the first trip by automobile across Canada (including one short jaunt into northeastern Washington State when the Canadian roads were virtually impassable).

From 1915 to 1925, under Scott's direction, REO remained profitable. In 1923, the company sold an early recreational vehicle, called the "Motor Pullman Car". Designed by Battle Creek, Michigan, newspaper editor J. H. Brown, the automobile included a drop-down sleeping extension, a built-in gas cooking range, and a refrigerator. During 1925, however, Scott, like many of his contemporaries/competitors, began an ambitious expansion program designed to make the company more competitive with other automobile manufacturers by offering cars in different price ranges. The failure of this program and the effects of the Great Depression caused such losses that Olds ended his retirement during 1933 and assumed control of REO again, but resigned in 1934. During 1936, REO abandoned the manufacture of automobiles to concentrate on trucks.

Reo Flying Cloud and Reo Royale 

REO's two most memorable cars were its Reo Flying Cloud introduced in 1927 and the Reo Royale 8 of 1931.

The Flying Cloud was the first car to use Lockheed's new hydraulic internal expanding brake system and featured styling by Fabio Segardi. While Ned Jordan is credited with changing the way advertising was written with his "Somewhere West of Laramie" ads for his Jordan Playboy, Reo's Flying Cloud—a name that provoked evocative images of speed and lightness—changed the way automobiles would be named in the future. It had a  wheelbase. The final REO model of 1936 was a Flying Cloud.

In April 1927, Reo introduced the Wolverine brand of cars as a companion model to the Flying Cloud. With a Continental engine, artillery wheels, and a different pattern of horizontal radiator louvers from the Flying Cloud, the Wolverine was made until 1928.

The 1931 Reo Royale was a trendsetting design, introducing design elements that were a precedent for true automotive streamlining in the American market. The 8-cylinder model was sold through 1933 with minor updates. The name was used on a lower-priced 6-cylinder model through 1935. Beverly Rae Kimes, editor of the Standard Catalog of American Cars, terms the Royale "the most fabulous Reo of all". In addition to its coachwork by Murray designed by their Amos Northup, the Royale also provided buyers with a  straight-eight with a nine-bearing crankshaft, one-shot lubrication, and thermostatically-controlled radiator shutters. As many as 3 Dietrich coachbuilt bodies were built on  wheelbases in 1931. Beginning in 1933, the Royale also featured as an option REO's semi-automatic transmission, the Self-Shifter. The Model 8-31 was priced at $2,145. The model 8-35 was priced from $2,745 for the sedan to $3,000 for the convertible coupe. The coachbuilt cars were priced close to $6,000. A convertible Victoria was listed at $3,195 but only one is known to have been built. The 8-35 & 8-52 are considered full CCCA classics.

After passenger cars 

Although truck orders during World War II enabled it to revive somewhat, the company remained unstable in the postwar era, resulting in a bankruptcy reorganization. In 1954, the company was still underperforming, and sold its vehicle manufacturing operations (the primary asset of the company) to the Bohn Aluminum and Brass Corporation of Detroit. Three years later, in 1957, Reo's vehicle manufacturing operation became a subsidiary of the White Motor Company. White then merged REO with Diamond T Trucks in 1967 to form Diamond Reo Trucks. In 1975, this company filed for bankruptcy and most of its assets were liquidated. Volvo later took over White and thus currently owns the rights to the REO brand name.

Meanwhile, after selling Reo's vehicle manufacturing operation to Bohn in 1954, management began liquidating the remainder of the company. For tax reasons a group of shareholders successfully challenged the liquidation in a proxy fight in September 1955, and forced REO to take over a tiny nuclear services company called Nuclear Consultants, Inc. in a reverse takeover. The resulting Nuclear Corporation of America, Inc., diversified and purchased other companies to become a conglomerate, spreading into an array of fields including prefabricated housing and steel joist manufacturing in addition to nuclear services. Most of these businesses failed and the company was bankrupt again by 1966. After reorganizing, only the successful steel-joist business remained; the company started producing recycled steel and eventually renamed itself Nucor.

Studebaker agreement 

Most Studebaker US6 trucks were built by Studebaker. However, during the Second World War, REO produced a number of them under license from Studebaker. The REO versions of the truck had some changes, such as different door handles and a more powerful engine. It is estimated that REO produced around 20,000 of these trucks and, unlike the original Studebaker trucks which were also used by the United States, the REO versions were only for export to the Soviet Union.

Products

Cars

19 AS
96-T
Comet
DC
Flying Cloud
Flying Cloud Mate
GB
Gold Comet
M-109
M-34
M-35
M-35 A1
M-48
M-49
M-50
M-52
M-Series
M-246
R-5 "Reo the Fifth"
Royale
Royale Elite
Runabout
T-6

Trucks

19 AS
AC
Apollo
Comet
DC
GB
Giant
Gold Comet
 M35
Raider
Royale
 Speed Wagon
Speed Delivery
Speed Tanker

Buses
 96HTD
 W series
 Gold Comet

Clients
 Toronto Transportation Commission
 Israel Defense Forces

REOs in popular culture 

 The band REO Speedwagon took their name from the REO Speed Wagon light delivery truck, an ancestor of pickup trucks.
 The band Diamond Rio took their name from REO's successor company Diamond Reo Trucks. The band misspelled "Reo" as "Rio", but lead singer Marty Roe decided to make a virtue out of his mistake. "I like it like that. It has a country-Southwestern flavor", he told the Chicago Tribune’s Jack Hurst.
 A REO is mentioned in a humorous 1933 short story The Car We Had to Push by James Thurber. It tells the story of Thurber’s family car, which would only start if pushed a long way. After several odd adventures, the car is destroyed by a trolley car.
 In the John Wayne movie Big Jake, set in 1909, the Texas Rangers were traveling in REOs, which were later destroyed by the bandits. (The cars destroyed were replicas, rather than the actual vehicles.)
 The song The Incomparable Mr. Flannery by band Clutch from their 2005 album Robot Hive/Exodus mentions the REO Speed Wagon.
 The song Night Guard by Canadian folk musician Stan Rogers mentions "a blacked-out Reo coming for another load". In the song, the Reo is the vehicle that thieves have been using to transport cattle they have stolen from an ex-rodeo rider who left the circuit to take up ranching. The song ends with the rancher firing his Winchester chambered in .303 British at the thieves and then calling the police (the police had offered no help prior claiming a lack of evidence).
 In Robert A. Heinlein's Time Enough for Love, Maureen Smith explains to Lazarus Long that her husband got rid of his car when he went back into the service, not because he wanted to leave her without a car, but because he wouldn't be using it for the duration of the war and because he figured she wouldn't want to learn how to drive it. Quoting him, she says: "'I didn't sell the Reo to tie you down. If you want to drive, buy a Ford; it's easier to learn on.' I told him I didn't want to drive; I would wait until he came home."
 In the novel Mrs. Bridges by Evan S. Connell, Mrs. Bridges drives a Reo.
 On the Andy Griffith Show episode Citizen’s Arrest, Andy and Barney are discussing a case that involved a man driving a Reo Flying Cloud.
 In the book The Power of the Dod by Thomas Savage, the Burbank's brothers drives a Reo.
 The famous Barnum & Bailey Circus exhibited sideshow performers, Tiny Tim and Tom Thumb, driving a scaled-down version of the 1906 Reo Model-A Light Touring Car known as the "Baby Reo".

 In the Television series "Murdoch Mysteries"

Advertisements

See also 
 Ransom E. Olds
 Oldsmobile
 Wolverine
 List of defunct United States automobile manufacturers

Notes

External links 
 A Tribute To The REO Motor Car Company many photos; angelfire.com site may be slow loading and have javascript pop-up ads
 R.E. Olds Museum
 REO automobiles at ConceptCarz
 REO Gallery at White Glove Collection
 REO Club of America
 REO (and Diamond T) Trucks (Hank's Truck Pictures)
 A REO Speed Delivery (State Library, Victoria, Australia images)

Defunct manufacturing companies based in Lansing, Michigan
Motor vehicle manufacturers based in Michigan
Defunct bus manufacturers of the United States
American companies established in 1905
Vehicle manufacturing companies established in 1905
Vehicle manufacturing companies disestablished in 1975
1905 establishments in Michigan
1975 disestablishments in Michigan
Defunct manufacturing companies based in Michigan
Transportation in Lansing, Michigan
Defunct truck manufacturers of the United States
Brass Era vehicles
Vintage vehicles
Pre-war vehicles
1900s cars
1910s cars
1920s cars
1930s cars
Cars introduced in 1905